This article is a list of sociological associations. It is intended to cover all professional associations dedicated to sociological inquiry or a subset thereof, whether or not the association is currently active.



A
Alabama-Mississippi Sociological Association
American Sociological Association
Armenian Sociological Association
Asia Pacific Sociological Association
Association for Humanist Sociology
Association for the Sociology of Religion, Formed in 1938 as the American Catholic Sociological Society
Association Francaise de Sociologie (France)
Association of Applied and Clinical Sociology (AACS)
Australian Sociological Association
Azerbaijani Sociological Association

B
Bangladesh Sociological Society (BSS)
Berufsverband Deutscher Soziologinnen und Soziologen e.v.
Brazilian Sociological Society
British Sociological Association
Bulgarian Sociological Association

C
California Sociological Association
Canadian Association of French-speaking Sociologists and Anthropologists
Canadian Sociological Association
Caribbean Sociological Association
Chinese Sociological Association
Clinical Sociology

D
Danish Sociological Association
District of Columbia Sociological Society

E
Eastern Sociological Society
Ethiopian Society of Sociologists
European Association for Sociology of Sport
European Society for Health and Medical Sociology
European Society for Rural Sociology
European Sociological Association

F

G
German Association for Law and Society, founded in 1976 as Association for Sociology of Law
German Sociological Association - ( Deutsche Gesellschaft für Soziologie, DGS)
Great Plains Sociological Association

H
Hawaii Sociological Association
 Hong Kong Sociological Association

I
Illinois Sociological Association
Indian Medical Sociology Association
Indian Sociological Society
International Institute of Sociology
International Rural Sociology Association
International Society for the Sociology of Religion
International Sociological Association
International Visual Sociology Association
Iowa Sociological Association
Iranian Sociological Association

J
Japan Sociological Society (JSS)

K
Korean Sociological Association (South Korea)

L
Latin American Sociological Association (ALAS)

M
Michigan Sociological Association  (MSA)
Mid-South Sociological Association (MSS)
Midwest Sociological Society
Missouri Sociological Association

N
New England Sociological Association
New York State Sociological Association
Nordic Sociological Association
North American Society for the Sociology of Sport
North Carolina Sociological Association
North Central Sociological Association
North West Indian Sociological Association

O
Oñati International Institute for the Sociology of Law

P
Pacific Sociological Association
Philippine Sociological Society
Polish Sociological Association (Polskie Towarzystwo Socjologiczne, PTS)
Portuguese Sociological Association (Associação Portuguesa de Sociologia, APS)

Q

R
Rural Sociological Society
Russian Sociological Society

S
Sociological Association of Aotearoa (New Zealand)
Sociological Association of Ireland
Sociological Association of Pakistan
Sociological Association of Turkey
Sociological Association of Ukraine
Sociological Research Association
Sociologists for Women in Society
Sociology of Education Association
South African Sociological Association
Southern Rural Sociological Society
Southern Sociological Society (SSS)
Southwestern Sociological Association

T
Taiwanese Sociological Association
Turkish Social Science Association
Turkish Sociological Association

U
Uganda Sociological and Anthropological Association

V

W
Wisconsin Sociological Association

X

Y

Z

See also 
Society for the Study of Social Problems (SSSP)
Society for the Scientific Study of Religion

References 

 
Associations